Gasr el Jadi, Qasr al Jadi, or Gasr el Gedi is a small village located at Cyrenaica in eastern Libya, near Bardia.

Populated places in Butnan District